North Korea competed at the 2011 World Aquatics Championships in Shanghai, China between July 16 and 31, 2011.

Diving

North Korea has qualified 4 athletes in diving.

Men

Women

Synchronised swimming

North Korea has qualified 10 athletes in synchronised swimming.

Women

References

Nations at the 2011 World Aquatics Championships
2011 in North Korean sport
North Korea at the World Aquatics Championships